Jason Colavito (born 1981) is an American author and independent scholar specializing in the study of fringe theories particularly around ancient history and extraterrestrials. Colavito has written a number of books, including The Cult of Alien Gods (2005), The Mound Builder Myth (2020), and Legends of the Pyramids (2021).

Biography
Colavito attended Auburn High School, in Auburn, New York, and graduated summa cum laude from Ithaca College in Ithaca, New York, where he received a bachelor of arts degree in anthropology and journalism in 2003.  

Colavito's work has largely focused on debunking "alternative archaeology".  His work has been cited in by John Kelly in a The Washington Post opinion column, by  
Stephen Winick and Firas Al-Atraqchi in The Huffington Post opinion pieces, and other publications, as well as on the History Channel. 

In 2005, Colavito authored The Cult of Alien Gods: H. P. Lovecraft and Extraterrestrial Pop Culture, published by Prometheus Books. In the book, Colavito explores the influences of H. P. Lovecraft's Cthulhu Mythos on the popular works of Erich von Däniken (author of Chariots of the Gods?) and Graham Hancock, as well as its overall influence on "extraterrestrial pop culture". 

In 2008 Colavito's The Science of Horror, the Horror of Science was published. The book examined the history and science of the horror genre with a particular focus on providing a broad overview and introduction to the subject. A reviewer in the Journal of the Fantastic in the Arts concluded "Academia aside, this is among the finest introductions to the horror genre I have read." and commends his epistemological approach to analyzing the genre.

In 2018 the SPLC referred to Colavito as an independent scholar with an expertise in the convergence of fringe theories with contemporary politics.

In 2021, Colavito published articles regarding UFOs in Slate and The New Republic. He was also interviewed for an article in Slate about the links between ancient aliens conspiracies and contemporary right-wing conspiracies like QAnon.

Publishing  
According to his website, Colavito offers out-of-print works about alternative history, the occult, and speculative fiction through his print on demand business JasonColavito.com Books.

Bibliography
His work has appeared in publications such as The New Republic, Slate, Esquire Magazine and Skeptic magazine.

 Books (as author)
 The Cult of Alien Gods: H. P. Lovecraft and Extraterrestrial Pop Culture (2005). Prometheus Books
 Knowing Fear: Science, Knowledge, and the Development of the Horror Genre (2007). McFarland & Company
 A Critical Companion to Ancient Aliens Seasons 3 and 4: Unauthorized (2012). Lulu.com
 Faking History: Essays on Aliens, Atlantis, Monsters, and More (2013). CreateSpace
 Unearthing the Truth: An Unauthorized Commentary on America Unearthed Season One (2013). CreateSpac
 Cthulhu in World Mythology (2014). Atomic Overmind Press
 Jason and the Argonauts Through the Ages (2014). McFarland & Company
 The Mound Builder Myth: Fake History and the Hunt for a "Lost White Race", 2020 University of Oklahoma Press
 The Legends of the Pyramids, 2021 Red Lightning Books

 Books (as editor)
 A Hideous Bit of Morbidity: An Anthology of Horror Criticism from the Enlightenment to World War I (2009). McFarland & Company
 Unseen Horror: 15 Tales of Invisibility and the Macabre (2011). JasonColavito.com Books
 The Faust Book: And Other Early Stories of Dr. Faustus (2011). JasonColavito.com Books
 Moon Men!: A Lunar Anthology of Proto-Science Fiction, A.D. 2001835 (2012). JasonColavito.com Books
 Theosophy on Ancient Astronauts (2012). JasonColavito.com Book
 Pyramidiots: Outrageous Theories about the Great Pyramid (2012). JasonColavito.com Books
 Foundations of Atlantis, Ancient Astronauts and Other Alternative Pasts: 148 Documents Cited by Writers of Fringe History (2015). McFarland & Company

Books (as translator)
 The Orphic Argonautica (2011). JasonColavito.com Books
 The Xipéhux (2012). JasonColavito.com Books

References

Further reading
External links

Jason and the Argonauts Through the Ages

1981 births
American skeptics
American television critics
H. P. Lovecraft scholars
Ithaca College alumni
Living people
Writers from Albany, New York
American male non-fiction writers